Manfred Rommel (24 December 1928 – 7 November 2013) was a German politician belonging to the Christian Democratic Union (CDU), who served as mayor of Stuttgart from 1974 until 1996. Rommel's policies were described as tolerant and liberal, and he was one of the most popular municipal politicians in Germany.  He was the recipient of numerous foreign honours.  He was the only son of Wehrmacht field marshal Erwin Rommel and his wife Lucia Maria Mollin (1894–1971), and contributed to the establishment of museums in his father's honour. He was also known for his friendship with George Patton IV and David Montgomery, the sons of his father's two principal military adversaries.

Background and family 
Rommel was born in Stuttgart and entered service as a Luftwaffenhelfer (air force assistant) in 1943 at age 14, serving in an anti-aircraft battery. He considered joining the Waffen SS, but his father opposed it. On 14 October 1944, he was present at his parents' house when his father was led off to be forced to commit suicide for his alleged complicity in the 20 July plot to assassinate Adolf Hitler, which was publicly portrayed by the Nazi leadership as a death resulting from a war injury. In February 1945, Rommel was dismissed from air force service and in March was conscripted into the paramilitary Reichsarbeitsdienst service.  Stationed in Riedlingen at the end of April, he deserted just before the French First Army entered the town. He was taken prisoner of war, was interrogated by (among others) general Jean de Lattre de Tassigny, and disclosed the truth about his father's death.

Post-war life and career 
In 1947, he took his Abitur while studying in Biberach an der Riß and went on to study law at the University of Tübingen. He married Liselotte in 1954 and had a daughter named Catherine. After a stint working as a lawyer, in 1956, Rommel entered the civil service and later became state secretary in the state government of Baden-Württemberg.

In 1974, Rommel succeeded Arnulf Klett as Oberbürgermeister (equivalent to Mayor) of Stuttgart by winning 58.5% of the votes in the second round of elections, defeating Peter Conradi of the Social Democratic Party. He was re-elected after the first round of elections in 1982 with 69.8% and in 1990 with 71.7% of the votes. As the mayor of Stuttgart, he was also known for his effort to give the Red Army Faction terrorists who had committed suicide at the Stuttgart-Stammheim prison a proper burial, despite the concern that the graves would become a pilgrimage point for radical leftists. In defending his decision against criticism from within his own party, Rommel said: "All enmity must end at some point and I think in this case it ends with [their] death."

While Oberbürgermeister of Stuttgart, Rommel began a much-publicised friendship with U.S. Army Major General George Patton IV, the son of his father's World War II adversary, General George S. Patton, who was assigned to the VII Corps headquarters near the city. Additionally, he was also friends with David Montgomery, 2nd Viscount Montgomery of Alamein, the son of his father's other great adversary, Field Marshal Bernard Law Montgomery, a friendship viewed by some as a symbol of Anglo-German reconciliation following the War and West Germany's admission into NATO.

In a 1996 celebration at the Württemberg State Theatre, Manfred Rommel received the highest German civil distinction, the Bundesverdienstkreuz. In his speech, Helmut Kohl put particular emphasis on the good relations that were kept and built upon between France and Germany during Rommel's tenure as Oberbürgermeister of Stuttgart. A few days after this distinction was given to Rommel, the city of Stuttgart offered him the Honorary Citizen Award. He risked his popularity when he stood out for the fair treatment of foreign immigrants, who were being drawn to Stuttgart by its booming economy. As mayor, Rommel also exerted "tight control over the city's finances, reducing its debt and enabling a radical makeover of the local infrastructure, especially roads and public transport [while working]...to foster Franco-German relations."

Rommel's political position was described as tolerant and liberal.

Outside politics 
Having retired from politics in 1996, Rommel was still in demand as an author and stirring speaker, despite suffering from Parkinson's disease. He wrote various political and humorous books. He was known for his down-to-earth and often funny sayings and quotations. Occasionally, he wrote articles for the Stuttgarter Zeitung.

Rommel collaborated with Basil Liddell-Hart in the publication of The Rommel Papers, a collection of diaries, letters and notes that his father wrote during and after his military campaigns. He was awarded several foreign awards including the Commander of the Order of the British Empire (CBE), the French Légion d'honneur, the US Medal of Freedom and the highest grade of the German federal order of merit. He died on 7 November 2013, survived by his wife Lieselotte and his daughter Catherine.

Movies 
In the following movies about his father during the Second World War, Manfred Rommel was played by the following actors:
 1951: The Desert Fox: The Story of Rommel (German: Rommel, der Wüstenfuchs) (Director: Henry Hathaway), William Reynolds as Manfred Rommel
 1962: The Longest Day (German: der längste Tag) (Director(s): Annakin/Marton/Wicki/Oswald/Zanuck), Michael Hinz as Manfred Rommel. Hinz's father Werner Hinz played Field Marshal Rommel in the film
 1989: War and Remembrance (TV-Series), Matthias Hinze as Manfred Rommel
 2012:  Rommel (Director: Niki Stein), Patrick Mölleken as Manfred Rommel

Additionally, interviews with Manfred concerning his father are featured in the 2021 documentary Rommel: The Soldier, The Son, and Hitler narrated by Greg Kinnear.

Honours 
Manfred Rommel once wrote about his many honours: "Die Zahl der Titel will nicht enden. Am Grabstein stehet: bitte wenden!" which translates as: "The number of honours seems to be endless. The inscription on my gravestone will read: Please turn over!"

1979: Honorary citizen of Cairo
1982: Orden wider den tierischen Ernst, for his sense of humor
1982: Grand Officer in the Order of Orange-Nassau of the Netherlands
1982: Honorary Senator of the University of Applied Sciences Stuttgart
1984: General-Clay Medal
1985: Knight of the Legion of Honor of the French Republic
1987: Guardian of Jerusalem
1987: Grand Officer Cross of Merit of the Italian Republic
1990: Commander of the Order of the British Empire
1990: Medal of Merit of the State of Baden-Württemberg
1990: Dr. Friedrich Lehner Medal for the development of public transport
1990: Bonding medal for German-American friendship
1992: Honorary doctorate of the University of Maryland
1993: Golden Order of Merit of the IAAF
1995: Otto Hirsch Medal
1996: Honorary Citizen of the City of Stuttgart
1996: Chairman of the joint chiefs of staff award for distinguished public service
1996: Friedrich E. Vogt Medal for Services to the Swabian dialect
1996: Honorary doctorate of the University of Wales
1996: Great Cross of Merit (1978) with star (1989) and sash (1996) *Order of Merit of the Federal Republic of Germany
1996: Appointed Professor
1997: Price of the Entente Franco-Allemande for the German-French friendship
1997: Honorary member of the German Association of Cities
1997: Heinz Herbert Karry Prize
1998: Dolf Sternberger Award for
2008:  Hans-Peter-Stihl Preis

Things named after him 
 After his death Stuttgart Airport added "Manfred Rommel" to its official long form name.
 A central square in Stuttgart which will be created in the course of Stuttgart 21 is to be named after him.

Works 
 Abschied vom Schlaraffenland. Gedanken über Politik und Kultur. Deutsche Verlags-Anstalt, Stuttgart, München 1987, .
 Manfred Rommels gesammelte Sprüche, Gefunden und herausgegeben von Ulrich Frank-Planitz, Engelhorn Verlag, Stuttgart 1988, 
 Wir verwirrten Deutschen. Ullstein, Frankfurt am Main 1989, .
 Manfred Rommels gesammelte Gedichte. Engelhorn-Verlag, Stuttgart 1993
 Die Grenzen des Möglichen. Ansichten und Einsichten. Deutsche Verlags-Anstalt, Stuttgart, München 1995, .
 Trotz allem heiter. Erinnerungen. Deutsche Verlags-Anstalt, Stuttgart, München 1998, .
 Neue Sprüche und Gedichte. Gesammelt und herausgegeben von Ulrich Frank-Planitz, Hohenheim-Verlag, Stuttgart 2000, 
 Manfred Rommels gesammelte Sprüche, dva, Stuttgart 2001, .
 Holzwege zur Wirklichkeit. Hohenheim-Verlag, Stuttgart 2001, .
 Soll und Haben. Deutsche Verlags-Anstalt, Stuttgart, München 2001, .
 Das Land und die Welt. Hohenheim-Verlag, Stuttgart 2003, .
 Ganz neue Sprüche & Gedichte und andere Einfälle. Hohenheim-Verlag, Stuttgart 2004, 
 Vom Schlaraffenland ins Jammertal?. Hohenheim-Verlag, Stuttgart 2006, .
 Gedichte und Parodien. Hohenheim-Verlag, Stuttgart 2006, .
 Manfred Rommels schwäbisches Allerlei. Eine bunte Sammlung pfiffiger Sprüche, witziger Gedichte und zumeist amüsanter Geschichten. Hohenheim-Verlag, Stuttgart 2008, .
 Auf der Suche nach der Zukunft. Zeitzeichen unter dem Motto: Ohne Nein kein Ja. Hohenheim-Verlag, Stuttgart 2008, .
 1944 – das Jahr der Entscheidung. Erwin Rommel in Frankreich (1944: The year of decision: Erwin Rommel in France), Hohenheim-Verlag, Stuttgart 2010, .
 Die amüsantesten Texte. Hohenheim-Verlag, Stuttgart 2010, .

References

Bibliography 

Puhl, Widmar: Manfred Rommel: Der Oberbürgermeister. (in German). Zürich/Wiesbaden: Orell Füssli 1990, .

External links 

1928 births
2013 deaths
Christian Democratic Union of Germany politicians
Grand Crosses with Star and Sash of the Order of Merit of the Federal Republic of Germany
Recipients of the Order of Merit of Baden-Württemberg
Luftwaffenhelfer
Honorary Commanders of the Order of the British Empire
Mayors of Stuttgart
University of Tübingen alumni
People from the Free People's State of Württemberg
Erwin Rommel
Chevaliers of the Légion d'honneur
Grand Officers of the Order of Orange-Nassau
German prisoners of war in World War II held by France
Deserters
Reich Labour Service members
Luftwaffe personnel of World War II
Child soldiers in World War II